Jeremy Beard is an American baseball coach and former pitcher, who is the current head baseball coach of the Cal State Bakersfield Roadrunners. He played college baseball at Linn–Benton Community College from 1992 to 1993 before transferring to Oregon State where he played for coach Pat Casey.

Playing career
Beard attended North Salem High School in Salem, Oregon for his first three years of high school. He transferred to Tigard High School in Tigard, Oregon for his season year. Upon graduation from high school, Beard enrolled at Linn–Benton Community College. Beard walked-on to the Linn–Benton baseball team and then walked-on to the Oregon State Beavers baseball program. Beard was 9–3 with a 3.62 ERA and 54 strikeouts in 82 innings. Beard lead the Beavers to a Pac-10 North Division title in 1994. Beard also lead the Beavers in innings pitched (91) and shutouts (1) in 1995.

Coaching career
Beard joined the Oregon State coaching staff while he completed his degree. Beard was then the head coach at Central Catholic High School from 1998 to 2001.

Beard returned to the college coaching game when he was named the pitching coach at Columbia Basin College. Beard spent 8 seasons at Columbia Basin. Beard moved on to be the pitching coach for Western Nevada College from 2011 to 2012. He also served as the pitching coach for the Portland Pilots baseball team from 2014 to 2015.

In the Fall of 2015, Beard was hired as the pitching coach of the Cal State Bakersfield Roadrunners baseball program. On December 16, 2016, Cal State Bakersfield fired Bob Macaluso and named Beard the interim head coach. After going 32–24 and advancing to the 2017 Western Athletic Conference baseball tournament championship game, Beard was named the full-time head coach of the Roadrunners.

Head coaching record

See also
 List of current NCAA Division I baseball coaches

References

External links
Western Nevada Wildcats bio
Cal State Bakersfield Roadrunners bio

Living people
Baseball pitchers
Linn–Benton Roadrunners baseball players
Oregon State Beavers baseball players
Oregon State Beavers baseball coaches
High school baseball coaches in the United States
Columbia Basin Hawks baseball coaches
Western Nevada Wildcats baseball coaches
Portland Pilots baseball coaches
Cal State Bakersfield Roadrunners baseball coaches
North Salem High School (Salem, Oregon) alumni
Baseball players from Oregon
Sportspeople from Salem, Oregon
People from Tigard, Oregon
Baseball coaches from Oregon
1972 births